Clarence William Hockenberger (February 6, 1885 – October 29, 1923) was an American football player. He played at the center position for Yale University in 1905 and 1906. He first-team honors on the 1906 All-America college football team by The New York Times, New York World, New York Sun, and New York Mail. Hockenberger played football at Andover before enrolling at Yale.

After leaving Yale, Hockenberger lived in Rochester, New York, and became a successful lumberman.  While visiting Cape Girardeau, Missouri to build a mill, he became ill and died of peritonitis at age 38 after undergoing an operation.

References

External links
 

1885 births
1923 deaths
American football centers
Yale Bulldogs football players
People from Ontario, New York
American people of German descent